The 1977 Gillette Cup was the fifteenth Gillette Cup, an English limited overs county cricket tournament. It was held between 29 June and 3 September 1977. The tournament was won by Middlesex County Cricket Club who defeated Glamorgan County Cricket Club by 5 wickets in the final at Lord's.

Format
The seventeen first-class counties, were joined by five Minor Counties: Bedfordshire, Cornwall, Durham, Hertfordshire and Northumberland. Teams who won in the first round progressed to the second round. The winners in the second round then progressed to the quarter-final stage. Winners from the quarter-finals then progressed to the semi-finals from which the winners then went on to the final at Lord's which was held on 3 September 1977.

First round

Second round

Quarter-finals

Semi-finals

Final

References

External links
CricketArchive tournament page 

Friends Provident Trophy seasons
Gillette Cup, 1977